Slade Ward is a 2-seat ward of Kettering Borough Council, covering the southern rural parts of Kettering Borough.

The ward was last fought at Borough Council level in the 2007 local council elections, in which both seats were won by the Conservatives.

The current councillors are Cllr. Jim Hakewill and Cllr. Cliff Moreton.

Councillors
Kettering Borough Council Elections 2007
Jim Hakewill (Conservative)
Victoria Perry (Conservative)

Current Ward Boundaries (1999-)

Kettering Borough Council Elections 2007
Note: due to boundary changes, vote changes listed below are based on notional results.

Kettering Borough Council Elections 2003

(Vote count shown is ward average)

See also
Kettering
Kettering Borough Council

Electoral wards in Kettering